This article lists the chiefs of the Polizia di Stato, a law enforcement agency of Italy.

List

See also 
 Commander-General of the Carabinieri
 List of commanding generals of the Carabinieri

References 

1878 establishments in Italy
Polizia di Stato
Law enforcement in Italy
Italian police officers
Polizia di Stato
Italy law-related lists